Elitegroup Computer Systems  Co., Ltd. (ECS) is a Taiwan-based electronics firm. It is the fifth largest PC motherboard manufacturer in the world (after Asus, Gigabyte Technology, ASRock, and MSI), with production reaching 24 million units in 2002.

The company has since concentrated on broadening its product range. After ECS's purchase of laptop manufacturer Uniwill in 2006, the company has been involved in the design and manufacture of laptops, desktop replacement computers and multimedia products. ECS computers used to be sold by Fry's Electronics under the "Great Quality" ("GQ") brand.

Design & Production 
While Elitegroup Computer Systems is headquartered in Taiwan, the company has production facilities in Asia and North America:

 Special Economic Zone Shenzhen: (ECS Manufacturing) & Golden Elite Technology & China Golden Elite Technology
 Suzhou: (China ESZ)
 Juarez, Mexico: China EMX, Mexico EMX Plant

OEM 
Many of these motherboards have been produced for OEM customers and are used in systems assembled and sold by such brand-name companies as Lenovo, HP and Zoostorm.  Its main competitors are Micro-Star International and ASRock.

ECS has also produced computers for Acer.

History 

Founded in 1987, ECS is headquartered in Taiwan with operations in North America, Europe and the Pacific Rim. The company merged with PCChips (Hsing Tech Enterprise Co., Ltd), a major manufacturer of low-cost motherboards, in 2005. In June 2003, ECS was selected for two years in a row for Business Week magazine’s exclusive Information Technology 100 list.

References

External links

 
 ECS Factory Tour in Shenzhen, China

1987 establishments in Taiwan
Electronics companies of Taiwan
Graphics hardware companies
Motherboard companies
Computer companies established in 1987
Manufacturing companies based in Taipei
Taiwanese brands